Șoldănești is a town in Șoldănești District, Moldova.

Șoldănești may also refer to several villages in Romania:

 Șoldănești, a village in Blândești Commune, Botoșani County
 Șoldănești, a district in the town of Fălticeni, Suceava County